Sowmaeh (also Romanized as Şowma‘eh) is a village in Yeylaq Rural District, in the Central District of Kaleybar County, East Azerbaijan Province, Iran. At the 2006 census, its population was 13, in 5 families. This a significant decline from the population of 37 in late 1940s.

References 

Populated places in Kaleybar County